He and She is a play written by Rachel Crothers in 1920, who wrote a majority of her plays amidst the first wave of feminism. It specifically tackles topics concerning masculinity and femininity, such as gender roles within a marriage and what it means to be a female artist in a patriarchal atmosphere. The play was first introduced in 1911, but failed to survive through production. However, Crothers did not abandon the project. In 1920, there was another attempt to resurrect the play's production with Rachel herself playing the female lead, though it too was ultimately unsuccessful (Shafer 20). After over half a century, He and She was revived by the Washington Area Feminist Theatre in 1973 (Grottlieb 14). 

According to dramaturgical scholars, it is "Crothers' most complex and pessimistic exploration of feminism's impact on society" (Grottlieb 50). The play features a married couple, Anne and Tom Herford, who are both sculptors. In the beginning, both characters encompass the progressive ideals for which Crothers advocated. However, when Anne wins in a competition over Tom, she is met with hostility and negativity from almost every other character (Crothers 90-98). Despite showing initial support, Tom becomes increasingly agitated and says to Ann that because she is a woman, “you’re not free in the same way that I am” and that if she refuses to stop and take responsibility of their home, Tom will command her to do so (Crothers 98). The argument is put to rest abruptly when their underage daughter announces that she is engaged and Anne makes the choice, albeit reluctantly, to care for her. Because it lacks a sense of poetic justice and the woman does not ultimately succeed, Crothers was heavily criticized for this play's ending. However, it sparked debate and discussion about what it means to be a woman or a wife.

Plot
He and She revolves around the Herford family composed of Tom, Ann, and Millicent. Other characters include Ruth Creel, Ann's friend; Keith, Tom's assistant who is engaged to Ruth; Ann's father Dr. Remington; and Tom's sister Daisy who lives with the Herfords. The first act of the play is set in the sculpting studio in their house in New York City. At the beginning of the play, Tom has a frieze that he is entering into a contest. Ann thinks she can do better and enters the competition with a piece of her own. At the same time, Keith and Ruth constantly argue about marriage because Keith wants a traditional, domestic wife while Ruth wants to continue working. In act 2 (set in their living room), they nervously wait for the results of the competition. During the waiting, Ruth breaks off her engagement with Keith. When the results come, everyone starts congratulating Tom, until they find out that Tom really isn't the winner, Ann is. This causes strife between her and Tom. Ann's father is furious that she did this to her husband. To make matters worse, Millicent comes home suddenly from boarding school. In act 3, the conflicts between the characters escalate. It is revealed that Millicent has run away from school because she is engaged to the school's chauffeur.  Ann believes that the only way to prevent this marriage is to give up her own sculpture to spend more time with her daughter, asking Tom to make her frieze for her. "He and She, pits a daughter's need for maternal care against her mother's passionate desire to fulfill her artistic ambition."

"The setting of Crother's three-act drama, a spacious old New York home, externalizes the ideal of Tom and Ann Herford, both sculptors, to forge an egalitarian marriage, free of the limitations of the stereotyped masterful male and the submissive female. Each has a studio in the basement of the home where Act One is set. Its ceiling is raised to double height to accommodate the couples's work, and to signal, perhaps, their less-confined domestic horizons."

"Millicent, the Herfords' 16 year old daughter, goes to boarding school and when she is home for holidays she is obliged to respect Ann's need to work- something her father enforces. As the play progresses, however, and conflicts begin to restrict Ann's sphere, the setting enhances the play's theme."

"The play is simply plotted around events which cause Ann to reevaluate her life as an artist. Two subplots, following the conflicts of two other women characters, enrich our understanding of Ann's conflict between her public aspirations and private duties and broaden the spectrum of women's dilemmas. at the end of Act One, Ann decides to enter a sculpture competition for which Tom is also vying, and although her decision surprises him, Tom eventually supports her move. The act ends with the couple shaking hands. When Ann wins the $100,00 prize, and Tom places second, his opposition to her mounts and reaches a climax near the end of Act Two. He accuses Ann of being dominated by ambition and selfishness, and he demands that she take up full-time domestic duties. Ann refuses him, while recognizing the danger to their marriage. The act ends, however, on Millicent's unexpected arrival from boarding school and her refusal to return. In Act 3, Ann finally learns that Millicent's hysteria and stubbornness are related to her romance with the boarding school chauffeur. Millicent announces her decision to marry the man, but it is clear to Ann that Millicent has come home out of a need to be guided in her confusion. Ann blames herself for Millicent's trouble because, during a holiday period when Ann was working on the frieze, Millicent stayed at school and obviously responded to the man out of loneliness. Once Ann becomes convinced that she alone can help Millicent, she decides to take her to Europe, and asks Tom to complete her sculpture."

Historical context
Crothers was born and began her career amidst the first wave of feminism. She falls under the category of the “New Woman,” a personified metaphor for the changes in social behavior of women of the time. The New Woman was “the social reformer in the settlement house, the factory worker, the telephone operator…all those women learning to openly question authority that neither included nor heed her” (Burk 37). At the time, feminism was known as the suffrage movement, and the common goal of the suffragettes was attaining the right to vote. This concept was born out of the abolition movement, which sought to end slavery, however the suffragettes were only advocating to legalize voting rights to white women. Despite the oversight in humanitarian ethics, they nonetheless pushed societal boundaries to a new extreme.

The suffragettes were met with much resistance. They combated stereotypes in the media and popular culture. They often found themselves being criticized for “unladylike behavior” that challenged Victorian ideals about domesticity (Rampton 2015). Although some extreme forms of protests were seen during the movement, such as hunger strikes, and protests, most public displays by the suffragettes were quite tame. These included signing petitions, pamphlets, and pro-suffrage inspired art. Finally, after years of gender stigma, the 19th Amendment was passed in 1920, which granted white women the right to vote (Bisignani 2015).

References

 Bisignani, Dana. "History of Feminism in the U.S.: The First Wave." The Gender Press. N.p., 23 Jan. 2015. Web. 01 Mar. 2017.
 Bowden, Peta, and Mummery, Jane. Understanding Feminism. Durham, US: Routledge, 2014. ProQuest ebrary. Web. 1 March 2017.
 Burke, Sally. American Feminist Playwrights: A Critical History. Ed. Jordan Miller. New York: Twayne Publishers, 1996. Print. Twayne's Critical History of American Drama.
 Crothers, Rachel. He and She: a play in three acts. Baker's Professional Plays, 1911, Boston Massachusetts. Print.
 Evans, Suzy. "Women Push for Equality On and Off Stage." AMERICAN THEATRE. N.p., 27 Sept. 2014. Web. 06 Apr. 2017.
 Gottlieb, Louis C. Rachel Crothers. Twaynes United States Authors Series. Ed. Eble, Kenneth. Twayne Publishers, 1979. Print.
 Johnson, Hannah. “Dr. Mrs. Marie Louise (Depaw) Crothers.” McLean County Museum of History. N.p., 2015. Web. 16 February 2017.
 Lindroth, Colette. Rachel Crothers: a Research And production Sourcebook. Westport, Conn.: Greenwood Press, 1995.
 "Pay Equity & Discrimination." Institute for Women's Policy Research. N.p., n.d. Web. 27 Feb. 2017.
 Rampton, Martha. "Four Waves of Feminism." Four Waves of Feminism | Pacific University. Pacific Magazine, 25 Oct. 2015. Web. 01 Mar. 2017.
 Shafer, Yvonne. American Women Playwrights 1900-1950. Peter Lang Publishers, 1997, New York. Print.

1920 plays